Madoryx is a genus of moths in the family Sphingidae. The genus was first described by Jean Baptiste Boisduval in 1875.

Species
Madoryx bubastus (Cramer, 1777)
Madoryx oiclus (Cramer, 1779) type species for the genus
Madoryx plutonius (Hübner, 1819)
Madoryx pseudothyreus (Grote, 1865)

Gallery

References

Dilophonotini
Moth genera
Taxa named by Jean Baptiste Boisduval